Watsonulus is an extinct genus of prehistoric ray-finned fish that lived during the Early Triassic epoch in what is now Madagascar. It may have also existed in what is now Himachal Pradesh, India, during the Induan age (Early Triassic). 

The type species, described by Jean Piveteau, is Watsonia eugnathoides. Because "Watsonia" was preoccupied, the new genus name Watsonulus was later erected.

Classification

Watsonulus belongs to Parasemionotidae, a family of early neopterygians closely related with halecomorphs. Other members of Parasemionotidae include Albertonia, Candelarialepis, Icarealcyon, Jacobulus, Lehmanotus, Parasemionotus, Qingshania, Stensioenotus, Suius, and Thomasinotus. 

Similar to Albertonia (Early Triassic of Canada) and Icarealcyon, the pectoral fins of Watsonulus were fairly large.

See also

 Prehistoric fish
 List of prehistoric bony fish

References

Parasemionotiformes
Early Triassic fish
Fossil taxa described in 1935
Prehistoric animals of Madagascar
Extinct animals of Russia
Prehistoric ray-finned fish genera